Burnt Beyond Recognition is the fourth studio album by Mentallo & The Fixer, released on June 10, 1997 by Metropolis Records.

Music
For Burnt Beyond Recognition, the Mentallo & The Fixer changed direction from the aggressive electro-industrial represented on previous albums to composing complex and melodic instrumental pieces. It has been posited that the album's concept is about the evolution of man.

Reception

The Burnt Beyond Recognition has been considered a dividing point for critics and the band's audiences.

Track listing

Personnel
Adapted from the Burnt Beyond Recognition liner notes.

Mentallo & The Fixer
 Dwayne Dassing (as The Fixer) – programming, sampler, sequencing, synthesizer, producer, engineering and mixing (8-11)
 Gary Dassing (as Mentallo) –vocals,  programming, synthesizer, mastering, producer, engineering and mixing (1-7)

Additional musician
 John Bustamante – Moog synthesizer (9)
 Todd Kreth – bass guitar (6)

Production and design
 Travis Baumann – cover art, illustrations
 Ric Laciak – engineering
 Modern Design – illustrations, design
 Jon Pyre – producer (1-7)
 Cindy Spoonts – photography

Release history

References

External links 
 

1997 albums
Mentallo & The Fixer albums
Metropolis Records albums
Off Beat (label) albums